Khunkar-Pasha Germanovich Israpilov (13 November 1967  1 February 2000) was a Chechen separatist warlord and an active participant of both the First and Second Chechen Wars. Khunkar-Pasha is from the Alaroy Teip (Uta-Bukhoy branch).

Israpilov took part in both the Budyonnovsk hospital hostage crisis and the Kizlyar-Pervomayskoye hostage crisis, and he was killed in the winter of 2000 during the retreat of the CRI from Grozny during the Battle of Grozny.

References

1967 births
2000 deaths
People from Kurchaloyevsky District
Chechen people
Chechen guerrillas killed in action
Chechen nationalists
North Caucasian independence activists